Bandido were a New Mexico music supergroup that released several albums during the 1980s. They released three studio albums, and a compilation album. All of their releases charted along the west coast, Chicago, and internationally in Germany, Venezuela, and Spain.

Their frontman Al Hurricane, as well as his son Al Hurricane, Jr., spoke fondly of their time with the band but reiterated their desire to return to their New Mexico music audience; as they felt that Bandido's sound was more akin to Latin music. The three Bandido albums comprise Al Hurricane's twelfth, fourteenth, and fifteenth albums. Between the first and second Bandido releases Al Hurricane, Sr. and Jr. released 15 Exitos Rancheros alongside Tiny Morrie.

Albums

Bandido's first release (track listing)

Bandido's second release (track listing)

Bandido's third release (track listing)

References

American country music groups
American supergroups
Al Hurricane albums
New Mexico music albums